Mohammed and Charlemagne is an academic book by the Belgian historian Henri Pirenne (1862–1935) which was first published posthumously in 1937. It set out an alternative argument about the end of Roman influence in Europe and the emergence of the Dark Ages which emphasised the importance of the Arab expansion in the Middle East and Levant which has become known as the Pirenne Thesis. Although successive historians have tended to reject the argument as an explanation of the period, it remains influential as a means of thinking about geography and periodisation in the Early Middle Ages and the debate it sparked is widely taught in university medieval history courses.

Argument and reception
Mohammed and Charlemagne represented the culmination of Pirenne's longstanding interest in the end of Late Antiquity and the beginning of the Middle Ages in Europe. It was first expressed in an article of the same name published in the Revue Belge de Philologie et d'Histoire in 1922 followed by a second article entitled An Economic Contrast: Merovingians and Carolingians" ("Un contraste économique. Mérovingiens et Carolingiens") in the same periodical in 1923. The two articles began a lengthy scholarly debate among historians, and Pirenne sought to explore further aspects of the subject in the body of studies later compiled into the book.

According to Pirenne the real break in Roman history occurred in the 8th century as a result of Arab expansion. Islamic conquest of the area of today's south-eastern Turkey, Syria, Palestine, North Africa, Spain and Portugal ruptured economic ties to Western Europe and cut the region off from trade and turning it into a stagnant backwater, with wealth flowing out in the form of raw resources and nothing coming back. Thar began a steady decline and impoverishment and so by the time of Charlemagne, Western Europe had become almost entirely agrarian at a subsistence level, with no long-distance trade.

In a summary, Pirenne stated, "Without Islam, the Frankish Empire would probably never have existed, and Charlemagne, without Muhammad, would be inconceivable". That is, he rejected the notion that the Dark Ages had been caused by the destruction of the Western Roman Empire by the barbarian invasions of the 4th and the 5th centuries. Instead, the Muslim conquest of North Africa made the Mediterranean a barrier; cut Western Europe from the east; and enabled the Carolingians, especially Charlemagne, to create a new distinctly-western form of government.

Pirenne used statistical data regarding money in support of his thesis. Much of his argument builds upon the disappearance from Western Europe of items that had to come from outside. For example, the minting of gold coins north of the Alps stopped after the 7th century, which indicated a loss of access to wealthier parts of the world. Papyrus, which was made only in Egypt, no longer appeared in Northern Europe after the 7th century, and writing reverted to using parchment, which indicated the region's economic isolation.

Pirenne's thesis did not convince most of the historians at the time of its publication, but historians have since generally agreed that the book has both stimulated debate on the Early Middle Ages and provided a provocative example of how periodization would work. It continues to inform historical discussion in the 21st century, with more recent debate focusing on whether later archaeological discoveries refute the thesis or demonstrate its fundamental viability.

References

Further reading

External links
 1939 English first edition at Archive.org
 Original French text at Université du Québec à Chicoutimi
 Mahomet et Charlemagne at Université libre de Bruxelles

1937 non-fiction books
History books about the Middle Ages
1937 in Belgium
Historiography of the early Muslim conquests